Cieślin may refer to the following places:
Cieślin, Kuyavian-Pomeranian Voivodeship (north-central Poland)
Cieślin, Lesser Poland Voivodeship (south Poland)
Cieślin, Łódź Voivodeship (central Poland)
Cieślin, Masovian Voivodeship (east-central Poland)